Sonia May Lannaman (born 24 March 1956) is a British former athlete, who competed mainly in the 100 metres. She won the Commonwealth Games 100 metres title in Edmonton 1978 and won an Olympic bronze medal in the 4 x 100 metres relay at the 1980 Moscow Games. In the 1977 Track and Field News world merit rankings, she was ranked number two in the world at both 100 metres (to Marlies Gohr) and 200 metres (to Irena Szewinska).

Career
Lannaman was born in Aston, Birmingham, England and competed in her first Olympics in 1972 (held in Munich), where she set a British junior record of 11.45 sec. In 1973 she became European junior champion winning gold in the 100 metres, followed by a bronze in the 4 x 100 metres relay. In the 1974 Commonwealth Games in Christchurch she won a silver medal in the 4 × 100 m relay.

In 1976, Lannaman won a silver medal at 60 metres at the European Indoor Athletics Championships in Munich. In the summer of that year she made a major breakthrough into world-class sprinting. She ran the 100 m in a hand-timed, wind assisted (+3.6) 10.8 sec. She also set a British record in the 200 metres. She was strongly tipped for medals in both sprints at the 1976 Montreal Olympics, but due to injury was unable to compete.

In 1977, Lannaman was ranked second only to world record holder Marlies Göhr in the 100 m. In the European Cup of that year she was second in both the 100 and 200 m and in the inaugural World Cup, second again in the 100 m and first in the 4 × 100 m representing Europe. She also ran the fastest ever electronically timed 100 m by a British woman with 10.93 sec in Dublin, which was wind assisted (+3.8), so did not stand for record purposes.

In 1978, Lannaman won the 100 m gold medal and 200 m silver medal in the 1978 Commonwealth Games for England and for Great Britain in the 1978 European Championships won a silver in the 4 × 100 m relay with teammates Kathy Smallwood-Cook, Beverley Goddard and Sharon Colyear. 
  
In 1980, she ran her fastest official time in the 100 m of 11.20 sec in July, having set another British record in the 200 m of 22.58 sec in May. She competed again for Great Britain in the 1980 Summer Olympics held in Moscow, Russia in the 4 × 100 m relay, where she won the bronze medal with her teammates Heather Hunte, Kathy Smallwood-Cook and Beverley Goddard. She also reached the 200 m final, finishing eighth.

In 1982, Lannaman competed in her third Commonwealth Games, winning a gold in the 4 × 100 m relay.

She currently lives in the village of Chorley in Lichfield District, Staffordshire.  She is married to Michael Garmston, former British athletics team physiotherapist.  They have one son, Bradley Garmston, a professional footballer for Grimsby Town.

Achievements

Note: Results in brackets, indicate superior time achieved in earlier round.

References

External links
 

1956 births
Living people
English female sprinters
Olympic bronze medallists for Great Britain
Athletes (track and field) at the 1972 Summer Olympics
Athletes (track and field) at the 1980 Summer Olympics
Olympic athletes of Great Britain
Athletes (track and field) at the 1974 British Commonwealth Games
Athletes (track and field) at the 1978 Commonwealth Games
Athletes (track and field) at the 1982 Commonwealth Games
People from Birmingham, West Midlands
Commonwealth Games medallists in athletics
European Athletics Championships medalists
Medalists at the 1980 Summer Olympics
Commonwealth Games gold medallists for England
Commonwealth Games silver medallists for England
Olympic bronze medalists in athletics (track and field)
Olympic female sprinters
Medallists at the 1974 British Commonwealth Games
Medallists at the 1978 Commonwealth Games
Medallists at the 1982 Commonwealth Games